URZ may refer to:

 IATA airport code for Uruzgan Airport, in Khas Uruzgan, Afghanistan, from the List of airports by IATA code: U
 URZ AP (Univerzální Ruční Zbraň Automatická Puška), an assault rifle of Czechoslovak origin
 "urz", ISO 639-3 language code of the language of the Uru-Eu-Wau-Wau people

See also
 Brime de Urz, a municipality located in the province of Zamora, Castile and León, Spain
 Quintanilla de Urz, a municipality located in the province of Zamora, Castile and León, Spain